Father James Cullen, S.J. (19 April 1867 – 7 December 1933) was born at Drogheda, County Louth, Ireland.

He was born at 89 West Street, Drogheda, to Michael Cullen, a baker, and Catherine McDonough. Initially, he was educated privately, then by the Christian Brothers,. He studied pure and applied mathematics at the Trinity College, Dublin, then at Mungret College, Limerick, before deciding to become a Jesuit. He studied in England in Mansera House, and St. Mary's, and was ordained as a priest on 31 July 1901.

In 1905, he taught mathematics at Mount St. Mary's College in Derbyshire and published his finding of what is now known as Cullen numbers in number theory.

He ended up looking after accounts for the English province of the Jesuits, while contributing to mathematics journals.

See also
Cullen number
List of Jesuit scientists
List of Roman Catholic scientist-clerics

References
Keller, Wilfrid (1995).  New Cullen primes.  Math. Comp. 64, 1733–1741.

External links
 Fermat Search

1867 births
1933 deaths
20th-century Irish Jesuits
20th-century Irish mathematicians
Number theorists
Alumni of Trinity College Dublin
People from Drogheda
Jesuit scientists